A Girl at the Window is a Canadian drama film, directed by Francis Leclerc and released in 2001. The film stars Fanny Mallette as Marthe, a young woman living in Quebec City in the 1920s; afflicted with an incurable heart condition which will eventually kill her, she is ostensibly in Quebec City to study classical piano, but decides to live for the moment and get more enjoyment out of the time she has after being exposed to the city's jazz nightclubs.

The film's cast also includes Hugues Frenette, Denis Bernard, Évelyne Rompré, Johanne-Marie Tremblay and Diane Dufresne.

Leclerc wrote the screenplay based loosely on his own sister, who herself died of a heart condition at a young age. The film was shot in 2000, and premiered at the 2001 Montreal World Film Festival.

The film received three Genie Award nominations at the 22nd Genie Awards in 2002, for Best Overall Sound (Dominique Chartrand, Luc Boudrias, Bernard Gariépy Strobl, Hans Peter Strobl), Best Sound Editing (Marcel Pothier, Guy Francoeur, Carole Gagnon, Dominik Pagacz, Jacques Plante) and Best Original Score (Pierre Duchesne). Mallette received a Prix Jutra nomination for Best Actress at the 4th Jutra Awards.

References

External links
 

2001 films
2001 drama films
Canadian drama films
Films directed by Francis Leclerc
Films set in Quebec City
2000s French-language films
French-language Canadian films
2000s Canadian films